Henry Kistemaeckers (1851–1934) was a Belgian publisher and the father of the playwright Henry Kistemaeckers.

References 

 
 
 

Belgian publishers (people)
1851 births
1934 deaths